

League notes
The Winnipeg Black Hawks change their name to the Winnipeg Barons.

Regular season

Playoffs
Semi-Finals
St. Boniface defeated Monarchs 4-games-to-0
Turnbull Cup Championship
St. Boniface defeated Brandon 4-games-to-none
Western Memorial Cup Semi-Final
St. Boniface defeated Fort William Canadiens  (TBJHL) 4-games-to-1
Western Memorial Cup Final (Abbott Cup)
St. Boniface defeated Lethbridge Native Sons (WCJHL) 4-games-to-2 with 1 game tied
Memorial Cup Championship
St. Boniface lost to Barrie Flyers (OHA) 4-games-to-1 game

Awards

All-Star Teams

References
Manitoba Junior Hockey League
Manitoba Hockey Hall of Fame
Hockey Hall of Fame
Winnipeg Free Press Archives
Brandon Sun Archives

MJHL
Manitoba Junior Hockey League seasons